Ajit Das (20 January 1949 – 13 September 2020) was an Indian actor, director and playwright. He started acting in Ollywood with the Odia film Sindura Bindu.

Biography
He was born on 20 January 1949, in Karanjia, Mayurbhanj district, Odisha. Ajit has been involved in drama since he was a child. His grandfather Sudhir Chandra Das was a playwright and he had a play troupe in Mayurbhanj. While there, he became interested in acting.

Career
Das started working in the world of Ollywood through the film Sindura Bindu, set in the 16th century. He played the villain in the film, which was directed by Dhir Bishwal. Since then, he has acted in many Odia films as a hero and character actor. In addition to feature films, Ajit has also acted in Doordarshan and Manch Natak.

Death
Das died on 13 September 2020, from COVID-19-related issues during the pandemic in India.

References

External links

1949 births
2020 deaths
People from Mayurbhanj district
Male actors from Odisha
Indian male film actors
Male actors in Odia cinema
Deaths from the COVID-19 pandemic in India
20th-century Indian male actors
21st-century Indian male actors